The Soloviev D-20P, built by the Soloviev Design Bureau, was a low-bypass turbofan engine rated at 52.9 kN (11,900 lbf) thrust used on the Tupolev Tu-124. A later derivative with increased bypass ratio, the D-20P-125, was developed into the Soloviev D-30 family of low and medium bypass engines.

Specifications

See also

References

Further reading

 

Low-bypass turbofan engines
1950s turbofan engines
D-20